Monck, Ontario may refer to:
Monck (electoral district), a former federal riding near Welland, Ontario
Monck (provincial electoral district), a former provincial riding near Welland, Ontario
Village of Monck,  within the township of Wellington North, Ontario